Canton is a city in Madison County, Mississippi, United States. The population was 13,189 at the 2010 census. It is the county seat of Madison County, and situated in the northern part of the metropolitan area surrounding the state capital, Jackson.

Much of Canton is on the National Register of Historic Places. The courthouse square is a historic shopping district and host to the Canton Flea Market. The picturesque Georgian courthouse is particularly notable and often appears in photographic exhibits of the South. The east side of town is a large part of the historic district with many homes.

Although not a major battle site during the Civil War, Canton was important as a rail and logistics center. Many wounded soldiers were treated in or transported through the city, and as a consequence it has a large Confederate cemetery.

Canton is near a large auto manufacturing facility owned by Nissan.

Geography
Canton is located at  (32.612015, -90.031638).

Climate

According to the Köppen Climate Classification system, Canton has a humid subtropical climate, abbreviated "" on climate maps.

Demographics

2020 census

As of the 2020 United States Census, there were 10,948 people, 4,774 households, and 2,953 families residing in the city.

2010 census
As of the census of 2010, there were 13,189 people and 4,494 households in the city with an average household size of 2.99. The population density was 621.1 people per square mile (239.8/km). There were 4,933 housing units. The racial makeup of the city was 19.5% White, 74.7% African American, 0.2% Native American, 0.6% Asian, 0.1% Native Hawaiian and Other Pacific Islander, and 0.8% from two or more races. Hispanic or Latino of any race were 5.5% of the population.

The age distribution was 27.5% under the age of 18 and 10.8% 65 or older. 50.8% of the population were female.

The median household income was $33,350. The per capita income for the city was $15,192. About 31.4% of the population were below the poverty line.

2000 census
At the 2000 census, there were 12,911 people in 4,093 households, including 2,991 families, in the city. The population density was 694.1 people per square mile (268.0/km). There were 4,333 housing units at an average density of 232.9 per square mile (89.9/km). The racial makeup of the city was 18.64% White, 80.30% African American, 0.15% Native American, 0.20% Asian, 0.14% from other races, and 0.57% from two or more races. Hispanic or Latino of any race were 0.43% of the population.

Of the 4,093 households 37.1% had children under the age of 18 living with them, 32.4% were married couples living together, 34.9% had a female householder with no husband present, and 26.9% were non-families. 23.8% of households were one person and 10.9% were one person aged 65 or older. The average household size was 2.99 and the average family size was 3.55.

The age distribution was 32.3% under the age of 18, 11.2% from 18 to 24, 26.1% from 25 to 44, 18.5% from 45 to 64, and 11.9% 65 or older. The median age was 30 years. For every 100 females, there were 85.7 males. For every 100 females age 18 and over, there were 79.7 males.

The median household income was $24,237 and the median family income  was $27,782. Males had a median income of $25,179 versus $20,815 for females. The per capita income for the city was $12,643. About 27.7% of families and 34.8% of the population were below the poverty line, including 49.8% of those under age 18 and 25.5% of those age 65 or over.

Economy
There is a Nissan plant nearby. In 2011 Canton officials considered pursuing annexing it.

Notable people
 Damien Lewis (American football) (1997-), NFL player for the Seattle Seahawks
Sister Thea Bowman (1937–1990), Roman Catholic nun (Franciscan Sisters of Perpetual Adoration)
Flonzie Brown Wright (born 1942), African-American civil rights activist
 The Canton Spirituals, gospel recording group
 Homer Casteel (1879-1958), lieutenant governor from 1920 to 1924
 Annie Bell Robinson Devine (1912–2000), civil rights activist
 George Doherty (1920–1987), football player, Buffalo Bills
 Scott Field (1847–1931), United States Congressman from Texas
 Rowland Garrett (1950-), professional basketball player
 L. C. Greenwood (1946-2013), NFL player with Pittsburgh Steelers, playing in Super Bowl IX, Super Bowl X, Super Bowl XIII and Super Bowl XIV
 Caroline Herring, folk singer
 Elmore James (1918–1963), blues singer, slide guitarist
 Sonny Landreth (1951-), blues guitarist
 Ronnie Lester (1959-), University of Iowa basketball All-American, NBA player for Chicago Bulls and Los Angeles Lakers
 Samuel Mockbee (1944–2001), architect
 George Raymond (1943–1973), civil rights activist
 Anne Moody (1940-2015), civil rights activist, author of Coming of Age in Mississippi, based on her work with CORE
 Earl B. Dickerson (1891–1986), World War I veteran, first black graduate from University of Chicago Law School, civil rights attorney, argued Hansberry v. Lee before the United States Supreme Court, founding member of the American Legion
 Rev. Cleophus Robinson (1932-1998), gospel singer
 John Henry Rogers (1845–1911), United States Congressman from Arkansas and a federal judge, who grew up near Madison and practiced law in Canton
 William M. Walton (1832–1915), Texas Attorney General
 Quinndary Weatherspoon (1996-), NBA player

Mississippi Blues Trail
Canton is officially on the Mississippi Blues Trail. Elmore James, a blues singer and a familiar figure in Canton, learned electronics by working in a radio repair shop on Hickory Street. Canton is rich in blues history centered on the juke joints of Hickory
Street, known to locals as "The Hollow", as well as other places in Canton. A Mississippi Blues Trail historic marker was placed in Canton on Hickory Street to honor the contribution of James to the development of the blues in Mississippi. Other noted blues performers associated with Canton include Grady Champion, Little Brother Montgomery, William “Do-Boy” Diamond, Boyd Rivers and Johnny Temple. Musicians include studio guitarist Bucky Barrett and the slide guitarist Sonny Landreth. Gospel singers include the Canton Spirituals and Reverend Cleophus Robinson.

In his dedication of Hickory Street, Governor Haley Barbour said,

Education
The city of Canton is served by the Canton Public School District and Canton High School. Canton Academy is a segregation academy in the area.

In popular culture
1974 Thieves Like Us
1988 Mississippi Burning
1996 A Time to Kill
1998 Walking in Mississippi
2000 My Dog Skip
2000  O Brother, Where Art Thou?
2001 The Ponder Heart
2001 Biker Zombies from Detroit
2008 Ballast
2013  As I Lay Dying
2016 Saved By Grace
2020 "A Time For Mercy", book by John Grisham

Climate
The climate in this area is characterized by hot, humid summers and generally mild to cool winters.  According to the Köppen Climate Classification system, Canton has a humid subtropical climate, abbreviated "Cfa" on climate maps.

References

External links

 Canton Chamber of Commerce official website
 Confederate cemetery page
 History of Canton's Jewish community (from the Institute of Southern Jewish Life)
Canton, Ms Flea Market

Cities in Mississippi
Cities in Madison County, Mississippi
County seats in Mississippi
Cities in Jackson metropolitan area, Mississippi
Mississippi Blues Trail
1836 establishments in Mississippi
Populated places established in 1836